Rita Montagnana (6 January 1895 – 18 July 1979) was an Italian politician. She was elected to the Constituent Assembly in 1946 as one of the first group of women parliamentarians in Italy.

Biography
Montagnana was born into a Jewish family in Turin in 1895, the daughter of Moise Montagnana di Fossano and Consolina Segre di Saluzzo. She began working as a seamstress and joined the youth movement of the Italian Socialist Party, becoming a provincial and regional leader. Alongside her brother , she was a founder member of the Italian Communist Party in 1921. The following year she established the La Compagna, the newspaper of the women's section of the Communist party. She married Palmiro Togliatti in 1924, with whom she had a son, Aldo, born in 1925. The couple left Italy, subsequently living in France, the Soviet Union, Spain and Switzerland.

She was a Communist Party candidate in Bologna in the 1946 elections and was one of 21 women elected. She was subsequently elected to the Senate in the 1948 elections. Her relationship with Togliatti ended around the same time after he had been having an affair with Nilde Iotti. After losing her seat in the 1958 elections, she returned to Turin to care for her son, who had been diagnosed with autistic schizophrenia.

References

1895 births
Politicians from Turin
20th-century Italian Jews
Italian Communist Party politicians
Members of the Constituent Assembly of Italy
Senators of Legislature I of Italy
1979 deaths
20th-century Italian women politicians
Women members of the Senate of the Republic (Italy)